The 1997 Crown Prince Cup was the 22nd season of the Saudi premier football knockout tournament since its establishment in 1957. The main competition started on 24 April and concluded with the final on 16 May 1997.

Al-Shabab were the defending champions; however, they were eliminated in the quarter-finals by Al-Tai.

In the final, Al-Ittihad defeated Al-Tai 2–0 to secure their record-extending fifth title. The final was held at the Youth Welfare Stadium in Jeddah. As winners of the tournament, Al-Ittihad qualified for the 1998–99 Asian Cup Winners' Cup. As runners-up, Al-Tai qualified for the 1998 Arab Cup Winners' Cup.

Qualifying rounds
All of the competing teams that are not members of the Premier League competed in the qualifying rounds to secure one of 4 available places in the Round of 16. First Division sides Al-Jabalain and Al-Khaleej and Second Division sides Al-Akhdoud and Al-Hamadah qualified.

Bracket

Round of 16
The draw for the Round of 16 was held on 5 April 1997. The Round of 16 fixtures were played on 24 & 25 April 1997. All times are local, AST (UTC+3).

Quarter-finals
The draw for the Quarter-finals was held on 26 April 1997. The Quarter-finals fixtures were played on 1 & 2 May 1997. All times are local, AST (UTC+3).

Semi-finals
The draw for the Semi-finals was held on 3 May 1997. The Semi-finals fixtures were played on 8 & 9 May 1997. All times are local, AST (UTC+3).

Final
The 1997 Crown Prince Cup Final was played on 16 May 1997 at the Youth Welfare Stadium in Jeddah between Al-Ittihad and Al-Tai. This was the fifth Crown Prince Cup final to be held at the stadium. This was Al-Ittihad's seventh final and Al-Tai's first final. All times are local, AST (UTC+3).

Top goalscorers

References

External links
 Football competitions in Saudi Arabia 1996/97
 goalzz

Saudi Crown Prince Cup seasons
1997 domestic association football cups
Crown Prince Cup